Janusz Adam Kobierski (born 24 December 1947 in Wólka Łysowska, Siedlce County) is a Polish priest (of the Catholic Church) and a poet.

Biography 
Janusz A. Kobierski graduated from the Pedagogic University in Słupsk (The Polish Language and Literature Faculty). He’s been publishing his poems in many periodicals and almanacs since 1972 (f.e. Tygodnik Kulturalny, Miesięcznik Literacki, Literatura, Gość Niedzielny and  Niedziela). He is a laureate of some poetic competitions, among others of Warsaw Autumn of Poetry (1980). He has published over 20 books of poetry.

He is a member of The Polish Writers’ Association (Stowarzyszenie Pisarzy Polskich). In 2008, he was awarded the Jan Twardowski Literary Prize for the volume Cierpkie wino (The Tart Wine of Life). He also received a Catholic Publishers’ Association FENIKS 2013 literary award for the volume Szukał Pana. Wybór wierszy biblijnych (He’s Been Looking for Lord).

In 1981, he joined the Congregation of Marian Fathers. After graduation from the Catholic University of Lublin, where he had studied philosophy and theology, on 9 June 1987 in Lublin he received the Sacrament of Holy Orders from Pope John Paul II.

Janusz A. Kobierski lives in Warsaw.

Works 
 Zza siódmej skóry (Wydawnictwo Poznańskie, Poznań 1978)
 Kolej rzeczy (Miniatura, Cracow 1990)
 Dar (LSW, Warsaw 1991)
 Wyrok dożywotni, first selection of poems (LSW, Warsaw 1993)
 Z Ziemi Jezusa (Wydawnictwo Księży Marianów, Warsaw 1997)
 Z Ziemi Jezusa, 2nd edition (Wydawnictwo Księży Marianów, Warsaw 1998)
 Na ziemi i w niebie, selection of poems (Instytut Wydawniczy Pax, Warsaw 1999)
 Poezje wybrane, selection of poems (LSW, Warsaw 2000)
 Poezje wybrane, selection of poems, 2nd edition (LSW, Warsaw 2001)
 Zapamiętam Świat (LSW, Warsaw 2001)
 Święto losów (LSW, Warsaw 2002)
 Poezje wybrane, selection of poems, 3rd edition (LSW, Warsaw 2003)
 Ku Itace (LSW, Warsaw 2003, 
 Z Księgi Rodzaju (LSW, Warsaw 2005)
 Cierpkie wino życia (LSW, Warsaw 2007)
 Dotykając jasności (LSW, Warsaw 2009)
 Niech się stanie (Oficyna Wydawnicza ŁośGraf, Warsaw 2011)
 Szukał Pana. Wybór wierszy biblijnych (Oficyna Wydawnicza ŁośGraf, Warsaw 2012)
 Szukał Pana. Wybór wierszy biblijnych, 2nd edition (Oficyna Wydawnicza ASPRA-JR, Warsaw 2013)
 Kamienne ścieżki. The Stony Paths (Oficyna Wydawnicza ASPRA-JR, Warsaw 2014) – Polish-English version (translator Zbigniew Lisowski)
 Kamienne ścieżki. The Stony Paths, 2nd edition (Oficyna Wydawnicza ASPRA-JR, Warsaw 2016) – Polish-English version (translator Zbigniew Lisowski)
 Słowa na wygnaniu (Biblioteka „Toposu”, Sopot 2016)
 Pole widzenia (Oficyna Wydawnicza ASPRA-JR, Warszawa 2019)
 Świat jednoczesny (Oficyna Wydawnicza ASPRA-JR, Warszawa 2021)

References 
 Biography in Kamienne ścieżki. The Stony Paths book, Oficyna Wydawnicza ASPRA-JR, Warsaw 2014, p. 403
 Janusz Adam Kobierski | Biografia literacka

External links 
 Oficjalna strona internetowa | Official Homepage 

Congregation of Marian Fathers of the Immaculate Conception
20th-century Polish Roman Catholic priests
Polish poets
Living people
People from Siedlce County
1947 births